Admiral Sir William Garnham Luard  (7 April 1820 – 19 May 1910) was a leading British naval figure during the latter half of the 19th century.

Naval career
Born in 1820, he was the eldest son of a local magistrate, William Wright Luard J.P., D.L. of Witham Lodge, Witham, Essex (formerly of Hatfield Peverel Priory) and Charlotte Garnham, only child of Thomas Garnham of Felsham Hall, Suffolk. The Luards were a prominent family of Protestant Huguenot merchants who had fled to England in the late 17th century as part of the mass exodus of Huguenots from France to England that followed the 1685 revocation of the Edict of Nantes.

Luard entered the Royal Naval College (formerly the Royal Naval Academy) at Portsmouth at the age of 13 and later studied at Portsmouth Naval College. He served extensively and saw action in the South China Sea, for which he was recognized in dispatches and decorated for gallantry and bravery several times including being named Companion of the Order of the Bath (CB).

From 1882 to 1885, he was President of the Royal Naval College, Greenwich.

He was awarded the Burmese War Medal for dispersing the pirates of Chin-a-poo and received the Medal of the Legion of Honour, 4th Class, from Emperor Napoleon III. He was promoted Rear-Admiral in 1875, Vice-Admiral on 15 June 1879, and Admiral in 1885. The Luard Islands, an archipelago off the coast of Port Moresby, Papua New Guinea were named after him. 

Luard was advanced to KCB by Queen Victoria in 1897, during her diamond jubilee year.

Luard married Charlotte Du Cane (an anglicization of the original French surname 'Du Quesne') in 1858. She was from another French Huguenot family (see Jean Du Quesne, the elder and descendants), with landed estates at Braxted Park and Coggeshall. Admiral and Lady Luard had 11 children.

A staunch Liberal and supporter of Prime Minister William Gladstone, Luard retired to his estate in Essex where he served as a justice of the peace and as an active member of the court of Quarter Sessions. He died in 1910 as a result of injuries sustained in a carriage accident. His funeral cortege in his home town of Witham, Essex attracted thousands of mourners.

References

See also
 

|-

1820 births
1910 deaths
Admiral presidents of the Royal Naval College, Greenwich
Knights Companion of the Order of the Bath
Deaths by horse-riding accident in England
Road incident deaths in England
Royal Navy admirals
People from Witham